The 1925 Five Nations Championship was the eleventh series of the rugby union Five Nations Championship following the inclusion of France into the Home Nations Championship. Including the previous Home Nations Championships, this was the thirty-eighth series of the annual northern hemisphere rugby union championship. Ten matches were played between 24 January and 18 April. It was contested by England, France, Ireland, Scotland and Wales.

Scotland's Johnnie Wallace scored a try against each other country in this tournament, repeating the achievement of Carston Catcheside of England the previous year. It would be 58 years before another player recorded such a feat, and 74 years before another Scottish player did it again.

Table

Results

References

External links

1925
Five Nations
Five Nations
Five Nations
Five Nations
Five Nations
Five Nations
Five Nations Championship
Five Nations Championship
Five Nations Championship
Five Nations Championship